R  (stylized as -R-) is the debut single album recorded by  Korean-New Zealand singer and Blackpink member Rosé. It was released on 12 March 2021 through YG Entertainment and Interscope Records. The single album was released for pre-order on 4 March. The single album was produced by Jon Bellion, Ojivolta, Jorgen Odegard, Teddy, 24 and Brian Lee. R is primarily a pop record with influences of synth-pop, dance-pop, electropop, EDM, alternative rock, soft rock, indie rock and rock elements.

The physical version went on to debut at number two on the Gaon Album Chart and became the best-selling album by a female soloist in the chart's history. R also set the record for the highest first-week sales by a Korean female soloist with 448,089 copies sold. It was certified double platinum by the Korea Music Content Association (KMCA) in November 2021 for selling 500,000 album-equivalent units. The single album was met with positive reviews centering on Rosé's vocals and songwriting.

"On the Ground" was released as the lead single on the same day the album was released. The single peaked at number four on South Korea's Gaon Digital Chart and number 70 on the US Billboard Hot 100, becoming the highest-charting song by a Korean female soloist in the United States. The song also debuted and peaked at number one on both the Global 200 and Global Excl. U.S. charts, the first song by a Korean solo artist to do so in the charts' histories. The music video for "Gone" was released on 5 April 2021, and the single peaked at number six in South Korea, earning Rosé her second top-ten hit in the country.

Background
On 1 June 2020, it was announced that Rosé would make her solo debut in 2020, following the release of Blackpink's first Korean language full-length album. On 30 December 2020, in an interview with South Korean media outlet Osen, Rosé revealed that filming for her debut music video would begin in mid-January 2021. On 25 January 2021, a 33-second teaser titled "Coming Soon" was uploaded to Blackpink's official YouTube channel and featured Rosé singing an snippet of an unknown track. Rosé's label YG Entertainment disclosed that she had "completed all filming for her solo album title track's music video in mid-January", and the release will be "surely different from Blackpink's usual musical style".

Soon thereafter, it was announced that Rosé will be showcasing the track featured in the teaser, later given the title "Gone", at Blackpink's first virtual concert, The Show, on 31 January 2021. On 2 March 2021, it was officially announced that Rosé will debut her highly anticipated solo project on 12 March, making her the second Blackpink member to release a solo work since Jennie's "Solo" in November 2018. The next day, new teaser poster unveiled the name of the lead single, "On the Ground", for the first time. The first music video teaser for "On The Ground" was released on 7 March. On 8 March, YG revealed the album track listing, which confirmed first-time songwriting contributions from Rosé on both tracks. On 9 March, the second music video teaser for the title track was published.

Composition

Musically, R is primarily a pop record with influences of synth-pop, dance-pop, electropop, EDM, alternative rock, soft rock, indie rock and rock elements. The single album is 6 minutes and 15 seconds long and features two songs. NME observed that "Rosé takes things back to basics, decluttering the often busy layers found on her group’s songs to just what’s needed and employing a quieter, softer approach". At an online press conference, Rosé said that she had a lot of input while making her debut solo project, from the cover art to songwriting. "Since our fans have waited for it for such a long time, I wanted it to be satisfying," she said. "I attended a lot of meetings to convey my opinions for the album, from its cover design to my first songwriting experience. " She added that she reminisced on her pre-debut days and passion for music while making the record. "I reflected on myself and realised how much I love music, get comforted and have grown with it. I wrote the songs in English as I thought it was the most fitting language for them. I hope they can comfort listeners as well."

The singer also revealed that she had originally recorded "Gone" for the first time two years ago. Meanwhile, "On the Ground" was "only recorded recently". When speaking to Nylon Magazine, Rosé admitted that R was her chance to experiment vocally. She stated, "Since this is my solo debut, I wanted to try out different sounds and different vocal techniques. I tried some new things. I think you’ll get to see a new musical side of me."

Songs
The single album opens with "On the Ground", an electropop, pop rock and pop song with synth-pop elements and an EDM-inspired beat, complemented by a simple guitar. The track features wispy, melodic verses accompanied by "breathy" vocals, angelic bridge, chorus that boasts the dance-pop punch and Rosé's high note at the end. The track sees Rosé reflecting on her life as a global K-pop superstar and she realizes what really matters in her life already lies within herself. 
In an interview with StyleCaster, the singer spoke candidly about the personal inspiration behind the track. She explained, "From when I was a trainee, I lived day to day, running towards my dreams. Once in a while, there are moments where I’d question my motives, and I think the lyrics express this really well. I think this is something to learn from as well." True to her roots, "On the Ground" is a homage to her youth. A love letter to her time as a young girl spending hours playing instruments with big dreams of sharing her art with the world. The second track, "Gone" is a soft rock and indie rock ballad underlaid with an electric guitar. Pertaining to a mellow vibe, the production of the song features a "stripped-back" sound and built around strummed guitar chords. The track is a heartfelt break-up song about someone who still has feelings for their ex who moved on. Rosé's smooth voice evokes a palpable, but relatable, sense of heartbreak.

Conception and title
According to a press statement, the album's title "symbolises not only the first letter of Rosé's name, but also a new beginning for her as a solo artist". "Many people call me by many names, so 'R' comes from the first letter of my names, and it represents my start of going solo," she stated during a global press conference. "Rather than the alphabet letter 'r' defining me as a person, I hope people will be reminded of 'R' the first thing when they see me." "On the Ground" is about a long and difficult journey to success and the pursuit of a dream. In the song, Rosé tells about simple things, which are much more important in life, family, friends, health, and personal happiness, and not the criteria of success, which everyone likes to boast of. In "Gone", Rosé sings about the difficult love that finally left her and about her broken heart. According to her, when recording each of the songs, she plays one or another character. Here, as she says, she just managed to be herself.

After the performance at Inkigayo, the singer said that "On the Ground" was created for those "who are in search of the meaning of life and answers to key questions", to show that “the answer is already inside, in the soul, and none should not look for it somewhere else". Rosé created the single's name herself and considers it to be the most successful line in all the songs that she has ever sung. It means that everything that Rosé needs is here, "on earth," and there is no need to rush somewhere to find this necessary.

Release and promotion
On 2 March 2021, YG Entertainment uploaded a teaser poster with the single album's name, also announcing the release date. Pre-orders for the album began on 4 March. The following day, Rosé teased the title of the album's lead single "On the Ground" on social media. On 8 March, YG posted the album's track list. R was released worldwide on 12 March through YG and Interscope in conjunction with the music video for "On the Ground". In celebration of her comeback, the singer held an online live broadcast an hour before the release to talk about the album and music video, as well as unbox the physical album. On 14 March, the singer appeared on the show My Little Old Boy as a special guest. On 20 March 2021, Rosé appeared on the South Korean TV show Knowing Bros along with Hyeri from Girl's Day. The singer gave an interview to The Kelly Clarkson Show and Apple Music's New Music Daily hosted by Zane Lowe. She also appeared on the magazine cover of Vogue Australia's April issue.

Singles
"On the Ground" was released as the lead single of R, alongside the album itself, on 12 March 2021. The song was accompanied with a music video directed by Han Sa-min. Upon release, the music video surpassed 41.6 million views in 24 hours and broke the record of former labelmate Psy's "Gentleman" for the most viewed South Korean music video of a soloist in 24 hours. In the United States, the song debuted and peaked at number 70 on the US Billboard Hot 100, becoming the highest-charting song by a Korean female soloist in the United States. It also debuted and peaked at number one on both the Global 200 and on Global Excl. U.S. charts, the first to do so in the charts' histories.

"Gone" was released as the second single on 5 April 2021, alongside the release of its music video. The music video garnered over 15 million views in its first 24 hours.  In the United States, the song debuted at number 15 on the Billboard Digital Song Sales chart. The song also debuted and peaked at number 29 on the Global 200 with 19.6 million streams and 25,000 downloads worldwide, and at number 17 on the Global Excl. U.S. chart.

Live performances
On 31 January 2021 the singer performed "Gone" at Blackpink's first virtual concert, The Show. On 14 March 2021, Rosé made the debut performormance of "On the Ground" and "Gone" on SBS' Inkigayo. On 16 March 2021, Rosé performed the lead single on The Tonight Show Starring Jimmy Fallon. On 18 March 2021, she performed "On the Ground" on Mnet's M Countdown, where she also ranked second place in the voting section of the show. The singer performed the song on Show! Music Core on 20 March. The song was performed again on Inkigayo on 21 March. On 27 March, Rosé performed the song on Show! Music Core. On 28 March, the singer performed "On the Ground" on Inkigayo.

Critical reception 

R received positive reviews from music critics, who praised its emotional weight and Rosé's songwriting. Rhian Daly of NME , awarded the album 4 out of 5 stars, describing the album as "a no-frills testament that proves a powerful voice and good songwriting don’t need to be big or ostentatious to shine." Writing for Beats Per Minute, JT Early gave the single album a positive review, stating that R is "a vulnerable and mature solo debut that demonstrates Rosé’s vocals and songwriting skills greatly." Seung Hoon Lee, a journalist for Osen, considered R as a successful debut and stated that Rosé's performance was more mature than on the Blackpink's debut album.

Awards and nominations

Commercial performance
Rosé's debut single album surpassed 400,000 preorders within four days, making it the best-selling single album by a Korean female solo artist at the time, a feat later surpassed by Lalisa. By 15 March, R had surpassed half a million stock pre-orders. Of the 500,000 preorders, 400,000 came from CDs, 48,000 came from the kit, and 52,000 coming from the vinyl sales. On 17 March, it was reported that the album broke the record of first week sales on Hanteo among female solo artists, with 280,000 copies sold in just one day after its physical release date.

R also set the record for the highest first-week sales by a Korean female soloist with 448,089 copies sold. The physical edition went on to debut at number two on the Gaon Album Chart, while the kit debuted at number seven. On April 23, YG Entertainment announced that the single album has sold 502,447 on the South Korean music chart service Hanteo. The company also noted that the feat makes Rosé the first South Korean female soloist to breach the half-million sales mark in about 19 years. In May 2021, R was certified platinum by the Korea Music Content Association (KMCA) for selling over 250,000 copies, and in November 2021 it was certified double platinum for selling over 500,000 copies.

Track listing

Charts

Weekly charts

Monthly charts

Year-end charts

Certifications and sales

|}

Release history

See also
List of certified albums in South Korea

References

Albums produced by Jon Bellion
2021 debut albums
Single albums
YG Entertainment albums